Deborah P. Christie was the Assistant Secretary of the Navy (Financial Management and Comptroller) of the United States Department of the Navy from March 16, 1994 to March 12, 1998. She previously served as Deputy Director of Theater Assessments and Planning for Program Analysis and Evaluation at the United States Department of Defense. Christie earned a B.A. in Mathematics from Duke University and continued her studies at the University of Virginia.

References

External links
List of Assistant Secretaries at Navy Historian Website

Year of birth missing (living people)
Living people
Duke University alumni
United States Assistant Secretaries of the Navy